Vincent Curry (born June 30, 1988) is an American football defensive end for the New York Jets of the National Football League (NFL). After playing college football for Marshall, he was drafted by the Philadelphia Eagles in the second round of the 2012 NFL Draft, with whom he won Super Bowl LII.

Curry wore number 75 with the Eagles out of respect for the 75 people lost in the crash of Southern Airways Flight 932, a Marshall football charter flight in 1970.

College career
Curry had his breakout season in 2010, as a junior where he had a career high 12 sacks. As a senior in 2011, Curry had 74 tackles, 11 sacks, and 6 forced fumbles. The 11 sacks were the sixth most in the nation and the 6 forced fumbles were second. Curry became the first Marshall player to win C-USA Defensive Player of the Year since Albert McClellan in 2006.

Professional career

Philadelphia Eagles
Curry was drafted by the Philadelphia Eagles in the second round (59th overall) of the 2012 NFL Draft. He was the highest selected player from Marshall since Darius Watts in 2004. Curry signed a four-year contract with the team on May 9, 2012. His first year was uneventful: He played 6 games, started zero, and finished with 9 combined tackles. He was given an increased role in his second year, finishing with 17 tackles, 5 assists, 4 sacks, and 2 pass deflections. Curry had a breakout season in 2014, where he played all 16 games. Although he did not start a game and he only recorded 17 tackles and 2 assists, he recorded 9 sacks, second on the team only to Connor Barwin, and led the team in forced fumbles, with 4. In a disappointing 2015 season, Curry was moved to outside linebacker and struggled to find a groove, totaling 12 tackles and 3.5 sacks in 16 games and no starts.

Although there was speculation that Curry could leave the Eagles in free agency, the arrival of new defensive coordinator Jim Schwartz and the transition back into a 4-3 defense cemented his return to Philadelphia. On February 2, 2016, Curry signed a five-year, $47.5 million contract extension with the Eagles with $23 million guaranteed. The Eagles won Super Bowl LII against the New England Patriots 41–33. Curry recorded four tackles in the victory.

On March 16, 2018, two years into his five-year contract, Curry was released by the Eagles after declining to take a pay cut.

Tampa Bay Buccaneers
On March 19, 2018, Curry signed a three-year, $23 million contract with the Tampa Bay Buccaneers.

On February 12, 2019, after one season, Curry was released by the Buccaneers.

Philadelphia Eagles (second stint)

On March 21, 2019, after one season away from the Eagles, Curry was re-signed on a one-year deal.

On August 10, 2020, Curry re-signed with the Eagles on a one-year deal. He was placed on injured reserve on September 15, 2020. He was designated to return from injured reserve on October 7, and began practicing with the team again. He was activated on October 17. He was placed on the reserve/COVID-19 list by the team on November 19, 2020, and activated on November 27.

New York Jets
Curry signed with the New York Jets on March 24, 2021.

On August 25, 2021, Curry announced that he was diagnosed with a rare blood disorder that required the removal of his spleen. He still hoped to return but was required to go on blood thinners after blood clots formed. This led to Curry being ruled out for the entire 2021 NFL season. He was released on January 7, 2022.

On April 20, 2022, Curry re-signed with the Jets. He was placed on injured reserve on September 1, 2022. He was activated on October 15.

NFL career statistics

References

External links
New York Jets bio
Marshall Thundering Herd bio

1988 births
Living people
American football defensive ends
Marshall Thundering Herd football players
Neptune High School alumni
New York Jets players
People from Neptune Township, New Jersey
Philadelphia Eagles players
Players of American football from New Jersey
Sportspeople from Monmouth County, New Jersey
Tampa Bay Buccaneers players
Ed Block Courage Award recipients